The Cabell County Courthouse in Huntington, West Virginia was built in the Beaux-Arts Classical style in 1899. Originally designed by Gunn and Curtis of Kansas City, and has been expanded in several phases. The construction of the courthouse was supervised by local Huntington architect James B. Stewart.

References

External links

Courthouses on the National Register of Historic Places in West Virginia
Beaux-Arts architecture in West Virginia
Government buildings completed in 1899
Buildings and structures in Huntington, West Virginia
County courthouses in West Virginia
Clock towers in West Virginia
National Register of Historic Places in Cabell County, West Virginia
1899 establishments in West Virginia